Calidifontibacter terrae is a Gram-positive, non-spore-forming, aerobic and non-motile bacterium from the genus Calidifontibacter which has been isolated from soil from Hwaseong in Korea.

References

External links
Type strain of Calidifontibacter terrae at BacDive -  the Bacterial Diversity Metadatabase

Micrococcales
Bacteria described in 2017